North Walsham R.F.C. is a rugby union club representing the market town of North Walsham in Norfolk. Between 1990 and 2008 the club competed in National Division Three South, making it Norfolk's only national League rugby team, but the team was relegated to London Division One for the 2008–09 season after a defeat against Lydney on 19 April 2008. They currently play in National League 2 East.

Current standings

Honours
1st team:
London 1 North champions (2): 1987–88, 2019–20
London Division 2 North East champions: 2012–13

2nd team:
Eastern Counties Greene King Division 3 North champions: 2015–16

Notable former players
Ben Pienaar
Calum Green
Jacques Potgieter
Toby Salmon
Jack van Poortvliet

Notable former internationals
 Ben Youngs
 Tom Youngs

Teams 
Minis: Boys and Girls play together:
U6
U7
U8
U9
U10

Youth:
U11
U12
U13
U14
U15
U16
U17
Colts

Girls:
U13 (Yrs 6,7,8,)
U15 (Yrs 9, 10,)
U18 (Yrs 11,12,13)

References

English rugby union teams
Rugby clubs established in 1962
Rugby union in Norfolk
North Norfolk
1962 establishments in England